Dandelion Seeds is the second studio album by Anacortes based indie rock band D+, released in 1998.

Track listing 
 "Cut it Out" – 3:56
 "Green Party" – 4:31
 "Don't Worry About Me" – 5:06
 "Dandelion Wine" – 4:23
 "Profits are Soaring" – 3:22
 "Rusted" – 4:20
 "My Best Day" – 3:28
 "His Heels" – 3:07

Personnel 
Bret Lunsford – guitars, vocals
Karl Blau – bass, vocals
Phil Elvrum – drums

References 

1998 albums
D+ (band) albums